Nikolai Mikhailovich Sologubov (8 August 1924 – 30 December 1988) was a Russian ice hockey defenceman who won a gold and a bronze medal with Soviet teams at the 1956 and 1960 Olympics, respectively.

World War II
Sologubov took part in World War II. Serving in the naval infantry he was wounded in the foot in a battle near Shlisselburg in 1943 when he stepped on a German booby trap. After a month and a half rehabilitation at a hospital he returned to front into the infantry and served as a scout. Six months later he was wounded into his arm, but returned to the Leningrad front once again. He was wounded for the third time during the Krasnoye Selo offensive, when a "jumping mine" exploded very close to him. The wound was so serious, that doctors were going to amputate his leg, suspecting gangrene. Fortunately, this diagnosis had not been confirmed, but he was operated four times on the right leg and four times on the left one.

Sports career
Sologubov took up skating to heal his foot injury and played ice hockey for several Moscow-based teams from 1949 to 1964, finishing with SKA Kalinin in 1964–65.  He played for the national team in all major tournaments from 1955 to 1963 (except for the boycotted 1962 World Ice Hockey Championships), including Winter Olympics, world and European championships. He was the team captain in 1957–61 and served as the Soviet Olympic flag bearer at the 1960 Winter Olympics. He won an Olympic gold medal in 1956 and the European title in 1955–56, 1958–60 and 1963. At the world championships he won a gold medal in 1956 and 1963, a silver in 1955 and 1957–1959, and a bronze in 1960 and 1961, and was named world's best defenceman in 1956, 1957 and 1960. He was inducted into the IIHF Hall of Fame in 2004.

Sologubov is known for trying to help the U.S. team at the 1960 Winter Olympics. When the U.S. was losing to Czechoslovakia, Sologubov went to their dressing room and informed them (using gestures, because he did not speak English) that they should use oxygen cans for better recovery during the breaks. The Americans came back to win the game and the gold medal. The Soviets needed the United States to defeat Czechoslovakia to have an opportunity to win the silver medal. However, the Soviets would lose their last game of the tournament, ending in a third place.

Retirement, awards and honours
In 1957, Sologubov was awarded the Order of the Red Banner of Labour. He was also awarded the Medal for Battle Merit and the Medal "For Labour Valour". After retiring from competitions he coached ice hockey teams in Penza (1966–67) and Novokuznetsk (1967–68). In 1967 he published a book My Friend Hockey.

References

External links
A to Z Encyclopedia of Ice Hockey

1924 births
1988 deaths
Ice hockey players at the 1956 Winter Olympics
Ice hockey players at the 1960 Winter Olympics
Olympic bronze medalists for the Soviet Union
Olympic gold medalists for the Soviet Union
Olympic ice hockey players of the Soviet Union
Olympic medalists in ice hockey
Russian ice hockey players
Soviet military personnel of World War II
Soviet Navy personnel
Ice hockey people from Moscow
Medalists at the 1956 Winter Olympics
Medalists at the 1960 Winter Olympics
IIHF Hall of Fame inductees